The St Joseph's Church (in Spanish, Iglesia de San José) is a simple gothic revival Roman Catholic church located in Colombia, exactly in Envigado, Antioquia; near Rosellón, and old textile factory, and part of the Roman Catholic Archdiocese of Medellín.

History 

A farm beside the highway near the textile factory was donated to the parish by the Rendón sisters, Elvira & Lucrecia. Jesus Antonio Duque, the parson, wanted build a new temple on the farm due to the increment of inhabitants around the factory. St Joseph was elected as patron saint by Duque's secretary because traditionally St Joseph is the lawyer and friend of the workers. Duque requested permission on May 29 of 1947, and the archdiocese named an assembly for the building with Jesus Antonio Duque, Francisco Restrepo Molina, Julio Uribe Estrada, Aquilino Saldarriaga Ochoa, Nemesio Álvarez and Pastor Garcés Londoño as members.

The plains was commended to an engineer sign, Colombiana de construcciones, and the direction was assigned to Jesus M. Velez. Durante the building process, some earthquakes happen, but the church was not affected. When the two lateral naves was finished, Duque began the masses on Sundays and holidays since November 7 of 1952. In December 1955 the new parish was erected by the archbishop with Antonio J. Gonzalez as parson since January 29 of 1956. Later, the church was adorned by Gonzalez.

See also 

Saint Gertrude's Church

External links 

 Archdiocese of Medellín

Envigado
Joseph
Joseph
Buildings and structures in Antioquia Department